Ouedia is a monotypic genus of dwarf spiders containing the single species, Ouedia rufithorax. It was first described by R. Bosmans & O. Abrous in 1992, and has only been found in Algeria and Tunisia.

See also
 List of Linyphiidae species (I–P)

References

Linyphiidae
Monotypic Araneomorphae genera
Spiders of Africa